John Frank Stevens (April 25, 1853 – June 2, 1943) was an American civil engineer who built the Great Northern Railway in the United States and was chief engineer on the Panama Canal between 1905 and 1907.

Biography 
Stevens was born in rural Maine, near West Gardiner to John Stevens, a tanner and farmer, and Harriet Leslie French. He attended Maine State Normal School (now the University of Maine at Farmington) for two years. At the conclusion of his schooling in 1873, bleak economic conditions held little promise of a job, and he chose to go west. Entry into the field of civil engineering evolved from his experience in the Minneapolis city engineer's office. For two years he carried out a variety of engineering tasks, including surveying and building railroads, and at the same time gained experience and an understanding of the subject. He became a practical engineer, self-taught and driven by a self-described "bull-dog tenacity of purpose." In 1878 Stevens married Harriet T. O'Brien. They had five children, two of whom died in infancy.

By the age of 33, in 1886, Stevens was principal assistant engineer for the Duluth, South Shore and Atlantic Railway, and in charge of building the line from Duluth, Minnesota to Sault Ste. Marie, Michigan, across the Upper Peninsula of Michigan. Although a large part of his work involved surveying, he assisted in all phases of railroading: reconnaissance, locating, organizing, and construction.

In 1889, Stevens was hired by James J. Hill as a locating engineer for the Great Northern Railway.

Stevens earned acclaim in 1889 when he explored Marias Pass, Montana, and determined its practicability for a railroad. Stevens was an efficient administrator with remarkable technical skills and imagination. He discovered a pass through the Cascade Mountains that bears his name, set railroad construction standards in the Mesabi Range of northern Minnesota, and supervised construction of the Oregon Trunk Line.  Hill promoted him to chief engineer in 1895, and later to general manager. During his time at the Great Northern, Stevens built over a thousand miles of railroad, including the original Cascade Tunnel.

 Stevens Pass in the Cascade Range was named for him. (Most other Pacific Northwest landmarks with the word "Stevens" are named after Isaac Stevens, who is of no relation.)

Panama Canal 
Stevens left the Great Northern in 1903 for the Chicago, Rock Island and Pacific Railroad, where he was promoted to vice-president. Then, in 1905, at Hill's recommendation, he was hired by United States President Theodore Roosevelt as chief engineer of the Panama Canal.

Stevens' primary achievement in Panama was to build the infrastructure needed for the completion of the canal. "The digging," he said, "is the least thing of all." He proceeded immediately to build warehouses, machine shops, and piers. Communities for the personnel were planned and built to include housing, schools, hospitals, churches, and hotels. He authorized extensive sanitation and mosquito-control programs that eliminated yellow fever and other diseases from the Isthmus. 

Reflecting his background, he saw the early stage of the canal project itself as primarily a problem in railroad engineering, which included rebuilding the Panama Railway and devising a rail-based system for disposing of the soil from the excavations. Stevens argued the case against a sea level canal of the kind that the French had tried to build.  He convinced Theodore Roosevelt of the necessity of a high-level canal built with dams and locks.

Resignation 
Stevens, like his predecessor John Findley Wallace, resigned suddenly from the Canal project in 1907 to Roosevelt's great annoyance, as the focus of the work turned to construction of the canal itself. Even though he had worked closely with the Panama Canal Commission chairman Theodore P. Shonts and was also able to directly approach the Roosevelt Administration with requests for the project, he only spent two years in Panama.

As a railroad engineer, Stevens had little expertise in building locks and dams, and may have realized he was no longer the best person for the remainder of the job. Stevens would also have been aware that the original Cascade Tunnel, for which he was responsible, had been built too close to the ruling grade (maximum gradient for a single locomotive) and was perhaps turning from a credit to a debit. The true reasons for his resignation have never been known.

Subsequent career 
Following the collapse of Imperial Russia in 1917, leaders of the provisional government appealed to President Wilson for help with their transportation systems. Stevens was selected to chair a board of prominent U.S. railroad experts sent to Russia to rationalize and manage a system that was in disarray; among his work was the Trans-Siberian Railway. After the overthrow of the provisional government, the board's work ceased. Stevens was awarded the Distinguished Service Medal by the War Department for his service in Russia.

Stevens remained in Allied-occupied Manchuria and in 1919 headed the Inter-Allied Technical Board charged with the administration and operation of the Chinese Eastern and Siberian railways. He remained in an advisory capacity until occupying Allied troops were withdrawn; he finally left in 1923. 

After his return to the United States Stevens continued to work as a consulting engineer, ending his career in Baltimore in the early 1930s. He was awarded the Franklin Institute's Franklin Medal in 1930. 

He then retired to Southern Pines, North Carolina, where he died at the age of 90 in 1943.

References

Further reading 
 "Conquering the Landscape" (Gary Sherman explores the life of the great North American trailblazer, John Frank Stevens), History Magazine, July 2008.
 "Stevens, John Frank" in American National Biography. American Council of Learned Societies, 2000.
 Baugh, Odin A. (2005). John Frank Stevens: American trailblazer. Spokane, WA: Arthur H. Clark Co.
 Foust, Clifford (2013). John Frank Stevens: Civil Engineer. Bloomington, Indiana: Indiana University Press.
 Hidy, Ralph W. and Muriel E. Hidy, “John Frank Stevens, Great Northern Engineer,”  Minnesota History (1969) 41#8 pp 345–361
 McCullough, David. (1977). The Path Between the Seas: the creation of the Panama Canal 1870-1914. New York: Simon & Schuster.
 Sibert, William Luther, & Stevens, John Frank (1915). The Construction of the Panama Canal. New York: D. Appleton & Co.
 Stevens, John Frank (1936) "An Engineer's Recollections", McGraw-Hill Publishing Company, Inc. Includes his essay: "To the Young Engineers Who Must Carry On"

External links

1853 births
1943 deaths
American civil engineers
American people in rail transportation
Panama Canal
American canal engineers
People from West Gardiner, Maine
University of Maine at Farmington alumni
Explorers of Montana
John Fritz Medal recipients
People from Southern Pines, North Carolina
Engineers from Maine
Recipients of the Distinguished Service Medal (US Army)
Civilian recipients of the Distinguished Service Medal (United States)
Grand Officers of the Order of the White Lion